Syra Yousuf, is a Pakistani model, actress and former VJ who works in Urdu television series and films.

Career
Originally a model, Yousuf started as VJ at MTV Pakistan hosting Bheja Fry and  Most Wanted. She made her acting debut in Hum TV serial Mera Naseeb. In 2012, she appeared in the serial Tanhaiyan Naye Silsilay with her ex - husband Shehroz Sabzwari a sequel of the Pakistani serial "Tanahaiyan" alongside Marina Khan, Badre Khalil, and Behroze Sabzwari. The next year, she began playing the role of Aleena in Darmiyaan. She acted in a drama serial titled Pasheman as Zartaasha with her husband on Express Entertainment. She was supposed to have made her film debut with the 2015 film Love You Babylicious, and was later booked to appear in Jawad Bashir's next film, Teri Meri Love Story, opposite Salman Shahid, Mohib Mirza and Mohsin Abbas Haider. She made her film debut in a project by the Hot Water Bottles production house, titled Chalay Thay Sath. Her next film Project Ghazi was released in 2019, which emerged as a critical and commercial failure.

Personal life
On 21 October 2012, she married Shehroz Sabzwari, son of actor Behroze Sabzwari in a private nikah ceremony in Karachi. Their daughter, Nooreh, was born in 2014. In December 2019, the couple announced their separation and got divorced in February 2020.

Filmography

Television

Films

Awards and nominations

References

External links

Living people
Pakistani female models
Pakistani television actresses
Actresses from Karachi
21st-century Pakistani actresses
1988 births